Sholem Aleichem Amur State University, formerly Birobidzhan State Pedagogical Institute, is a university in Russia. This is the only university based in the Jewish Autonomous Oblast. It is named after Jewish-Russian author Sholem Aleichem.

Overview
The university works in cooperation with the local Jewish community of Birobidzhan and the Birobidzhan Orthodox Synagogue. It is unique in the Russian Far East. The basis of the training courses is study of the Hebrew language, history and classic Jewish texts.

In recent years, the Jewish Autonomous Oblast has grown interest in its Jewish roots. Students study Hebrew and Yiddish at the Jewish school and Birobidzhan Jewish National University. In 1989, the Jewish Center founded a Sunday school, where children can study Yiddish, learn Jewish folk  dance, and  history of Israel. The Israeli government helps fund this program.

In 2007, the first Birobidzhan International Summer Program for Yiddish Language and Culture was launched by Boris Kotlerman, a Yiddish studies professor at Bar-Ilan University. Yiddish is still the region's second official language after Russian, although it is spoken only by a handful of 4,000 remaining Jews. This program includes a workshop on the village of Valdgeym and its Yiddish heritage.

See also
Jews and Judaism in the Jewish Autonomous Oblast

References

External links
Amur State University named for Sholom Aleichem
Far Eastern Research Center for Jewish Culture and Yiddish
Amur University Center for the Study of English

Buildings and structures in the Jewish Autonomous Oblast
Jewish universities and colleges
Judaic studies
Universities in the Russian Far East
Yiddish culture in Russia
Birobidzhan